Diplodonta punctata, or the Atlantic diplodon, is a species of bivalve mollusc in the family Ungulinidae. It can be found along the Atlantic coast of North America, ranging from North Carolina to the West Indies and Bermuda.

References

Ungulinidae
Bivalves described in 1822